Fatty's Faithful Fido is a 1915 American short comedy film directed by and starring Fatty Arbuckle. The silent movie, from the Keystone Film Company, has no onscreen cast and crew credits. The copyright credits Mack Sennett.

Cast
 Roscoe "Fatty" Arbuckle
 Minta Durfee
 Al St. John
 Joe Bordeaux
 Glen Cavender
 Luke the Dog
 Ted Edwards
 Frank Hayes
 Leo White

See also
 Fatty Arbuckle filmography

References

External links

1915 films
1915 comedy films
1915 short films
Films directed by Roscoe Arbuckle
Silent American comedy films
American silent short films
American black-and-white films
American comedy short films
Films about dogs
1910s American films
1910s English-language films